Latha Venkataraman is a physicist. She is a professor of applied physics and chemistry at Columbia University.

Biography
Venkataraman completed her BSc in Physics at Massachusetts Institute of Technology in 1993, followed by Masters and PhD degrees at Harvard University. Her thesis was titled Electronic properties of one-dimensional conductors: A study of molybdenum selenide molecular wires and was completed under Charles Lieber.

She worked at Vytran Corporation before moving to Columbia University in 2003, where she is currently the Lawrence Gussman Professor of Applied Physics and Professor of Chemistry. Venkataraman has been serving as Vice Provost for Faculty Affairs since January 2019.

Research
Venkataraman researches fundamental properties of single-molecule devices, combining physics, chemistry, and engineering.

Honours and awards
 2008 - National Science Foundation Career Award
 2008 - Packard Fellowship for Science and Engineering
 2011 - Alfred P. Sloan Fellowship in Chemistry
 2015 - Fellow of the American Physical Society for "pioneering contributions to measurement and understanding of electron transport through single organic molecules"

Publications

References

External links
 
 Latha Venkataraman at Columbia University

Living people
Year of birth missing (living people)
Columbia University faculty
Fellows of the American Physical Society
Harvard University alumni
American women physicists
21st-century American physicists
Place of birth missing (living people)
Massachusetts Institute of Technology alumni
21st-century American women scientists